Filip Cristian Jianu (born 18 September 2001) is a Romanian tennis player.

Jianu has a career high ATP singles ranking of No. 264 achieved on 16 January 2023 and a doubles ranking of No. 560 achieved on 28 November 2022.

Jianu has a career high ITF junior ranking of No. 5 achieved on 4 February 2019.

Jianu represents Romania at the Davis Cup.

ATP Challenger and ITF World Tennis Tour finals

Singles: 10 (5–5)

References

External links
 
 
 

2001 births
Living people
Romanian male tennis players
Tennis players from Bucharest
Tennis players at the 2018 Summer Youth Olympics
21st-century Romanian people